Amudalapalle is a village in Podili mandal, located in Prakasam district of Andhra Pradesh in India.

References

Villages in Prakasam district